"Worth a Shot" is a song recorded by Canadian country artist Aaron Pritchett. The track was written by Andy Albert and Clint Lagerberg. It was the lead single off Pritchett's extended play Out on the Town.

Commercial performance
"Worth a Shot" reached a peak of #6 on the Billboard Canada Country chart dated October 6, 2018, marking Pritchett's ninth Top 10 hit. It has been certified Gold by Music Canada.

Music video
The official music video for "Worth a Shot" premiered on June 19, 2018. It was directed by Cole Northey. The video stars Justin Pasutto, and features a cameo appearance from his fiancée, Jillian Harris, most known for her role on reality television show Love It or List It Vancouver.

Charts

Certifications

References

2018 songs
2018 singles
Aaron Pritchett songs
Songs written by Andy Albert